Stigmella polymorpha is a moth of the family Nepticulidae. It is known from the western part of the Kopet Dag ridge in Turkmenistan.

The larvae feed on Rosa species. They probably mine the leaves of their host plant.

References

Nepticulidae
Moths described in 2003
Endemic fauna of Turkmenistan
Moths of Asia